Anna Meredith may refer to

 Anna Meredith (born 1978), Scottish composer
 Anna Meredith (veterinary surgeon)

See also
 Anne Meredith Barry, Canadian artist